This article presents a list of the historical events and publications of Australian literature during 1883.

Books 

 Ada Cambridge — The Three Miss Kings
 Henrietta Dugdale — A Few Hours in a Far-Off Age
 Helen Mathers — Sam's Sweetheart
 Rosa Praed — Moloch : A Story of Sacrifice

Poetry 

 Victor J. Daley
 "At the Opera"
 "Dreams"
 John Farrell — "How He Died"
 Charles Harpur — Poems
 Douglas Sladen
 Australian Lyrics
 Poetry of Exiles
 "The Wentworth Falls, Blue Mountains"

Short stories 

 G. Herbert Gibson — Old Friends under New Aspects

Births 

A list, ordered by date of birth (and, if the date is either unspecified or repeated, ordered alphabetically by surname) of births in 1883 of Australian literary figures, authors of written works or literature-related individuals follows, including year of death.

 16 March — Ethel Anderson, poet (born in England, died 1958)
 1 August — Ethel Nhill Victoria Stonehouse, novelist and poet (died 1964)
 4 December — Katherine Susannah Prichard, novelist (died 1969)
 12 December — William Baylebridge, poet (died 1942)

Deaths 

A list, ordered by date of death (and, if the date is either unspecified or repeated, ordered alphabetically by surname) of deaths in 1883 of Australian literary figures, authors of written works or literature-related individuals follows, including year of birth.

See also 
 1883 in literature
 1883 in poetry
 List of years in literature

References

Literature
Australian literature by year
19th-century Australian literature
1883 in literature